The women's long jump event  at the 1984 European Athletics Indoor Championships was held on 3 March.

Results

References

Long jump at the European Athletics Indoor Championships
Long
Euro